Stride Rite, formerly the Stride Rite Corporation and stylized in all lowercase, is an American children's footwear company. The company markets Stride Rite products globally through brand licensee Vida Shoes International.

History

Founding and early years 
Stride Rite was founded in Boston, Massachusetts, in 1919, as the Green Shoe Manufacturing Company (“Green Shoe”) by Jacob A. Slosberg and Philip Green. After founding the company, Green sold his interest to Slosberg twelve years later and Slosberg's sons Samuel and Charles led up the company as the heads of sales and manufacturing respectively. Green Shoe became a public company in 1960 and was listed on the New York Stock Exchange.

In 1966 Green Shoe adopted the Stride Rite Corporation name to emphasize the brand name of one of its best-known products. The name was purchased from Tom Lalonde in 1933.

In 1968 Arnold Hiatt, the son of a Lithuanian immigrant, became president of the firm and sales were $35 million. Hiatt pursued a policy of acquisitions to keep the firm in tune with consumer preferences.

Acquisitions and expansion 
Stride Rite's first retail store was opened in 1972. The Sperry Top-Sider and Keds brand names were purchased from Uniroyal in 1979. Stride Rite purchased Toddler University in 1994. During 2005 Stride Rite completed its acquisition of Saucony and in 2006 Stride Rite purchased Robeez.

Hiatt was instrumental in bringing in socially conscious business methods such as opening a day care center in 1971, as well as a Senior Day Care center for parents of employees, banning smoking in 1986, and sponsoring 40 inner-city youth to attend Harvard University, Hiatt's alma mater. In 1992, Hiatt stepped down as chairman to pursue philanthropy through the company's foundation, and he has become a staunch advocate for electoral reform.

Collective Brands 
In 2007, Payless ShoeSource of Topeka, Kansas acquired Stride Rite. On August 16, 2007, the company changed its name to Collective Brands, Inc. By 2009, it was announced that Stride Rite would operate under the further-revised name of Collective Brands Performance + Lifestyle Group.

Wolverine World Wide 
In 2012, Stride Rite, Keds, Sperry Top-Sider, and Saucony, became part of Wolverine World Wide after a joint agreement with Blum Capital Partners and Golden Gate Capital acquired the Performance Lifestyle Group of Collective Brands for US$1.23 billion.

Stride Rite stores 

Stride Rite retail children's stores are located primarily in larger regional shopping centers, clustered generally in the major marketing areas of the U.S.. The number of retail stores, as of 2012, by type for the Stride Rite Retail segment is represented in the table below.

See also
 Arnold Hiatt
 Wolverine World Wide

In popular culture
It sponsors Curious George on PBS Kids.

References

External links

Companies based in Lexington, Massachusetts
Clothing companies established in 1919
Wolverine World Wide
American companies established in 1919
1919 establishments in Massachusetts